Brigadier General Engineer Juan Francisco Azcárate Pino (December 8, 1896 – June 2, 1987) was an officer in the Mexican military, a diplomat, and a designer of military aircraft.

As chief of the department of aviation, Azcárate oversaw the manufacture of military aircraft of his own design at the National Aviation Workshops. He was later appointed military attaché to the Mexican embassy in the United States, and during World War II was minister of the Mexican embassy in Germany. His published works include Un Programa Político Internacional (1932), Esencia de la Revolución, (1966) and Trilogía Moderna Contemporánea (1978).

References
 
 Zavala, Juan Roberto. (2005) Científicos y tecnólogos de Nuevo León Diccionario Biográfico. Colegio de Estudios Científicos y Tecnológicos del Estado de Nuevo León: Monterrey, 23.

1896 births
1987 deaths
20th-century Mexican engineers
Mexican people of Basque descent